The term heat sink may refer to:

 Heat sink, a component used to conduct heat away from an object
 Thermal energy storage, a number of technologies that store energy in a thermal reservoir for later reuse
 A heat reservoir which can absorb arbitrary amounts of energy without changing temperature